Mohan Sithara is an Indian music composer. He received the Kerala State Film Award for the Best Music Director (2009) for the songs in Priyanandan's Soofi Paranja Kadha. Since 1986 he has been an active musician in the Malayalam film industry. His work mixes Western, Classical and folk styles. He has worked with lyricists and poets like O. N. V Kurup, Yusufali Kechery, Sreekumaran Thampi, Rajeev Alunkal, Kaithapram Damodaran Namboothiri, S. Ramesan Nair, Vinayan, Bharanikkavu Sivakumar, Anil Panachooran, Vayalar Sarath Chandra Varma, Gireesh Puthenchery, and Bichu Thirumala. Many prominent singers have sung his songs, including K. J. Yesudas, P. Jayachandran, M.G.Sreekumar, K. S. Chithra, Shreya Ghoshal, Sujatha Mohan, Madhu Balakrishnan, G. Venugopal, Vidhu Prathap, Afsal, Manjari, Jyotsna Radhakrishnan, and Biju Narayanan.

Early life
Mohan Sithara was born at Peruvallur, near Chavakkad, Thrissur, Kerala, India, in 1959. He started his music career as violinist in some music troupes, one of which was Sithara troupe (from which he took the name Mohan Sithara). Later he worked with various music composers including M. G. Radhakrishnan, Shyam, and Perumbavoor G. Raveendranath. He did orchestration for the film Thoovanathumbikal with Perumbavoor G. Raveendranath, which led to several hit songs. His first work as independent music director in the Malayalam film industry was the film Onnu Muthal Poojyam Vare (From One to Zero), for which he composed the song "Raree Rareeram Raro" (it was also the first song for G. Venugopal).

Filmography
1986
 Onnu Muthal Poojyam Vare
1987
 Varshangal Poyathariyathe
 Mizhiyithalil Kanneerumaayi
1988
 Kudumbapuranam
 Aalilakkuruvikal
 Maamalakalkkappurath
 Deerghasumangalee Bhava
1989
 Devadas
 Mudra
 Eenam Maranna Kaattu
 Njaattuvela
 Innale (Background Score)
 Chanakyan
1990
 Vachanam
 Parampara
 His Highness Abdullah (Background Music)
 Marupuram
 Maalayogam
 Ammayude swantham Kunjumeri
 Manju peyyunna Raathri
1991
 Santhwanam
 Mukha Chithram
 Georgekutty C/O Georgekutty
 Aviraamam
 Holiday
1992
 Utsavamelam
 Mukhamudra
 Ponnaramthottathe Raajaavu
 Ayalathe Adheham (Background score)
 Ente ponnu thamburaan (Background score)
 Kallan Kappalil Thanne
 Sathyaprathijna
 Avarude Sanketham
 First Bell
 Kunjikuruvi
 Ormakkurippukal
1993
 Aalavattam
 Kulapathi
 Kaavadiyaattam
 Aparna
 Porutham
 Ponnuchaami
 Vakkeel Vasudev
 Johny
 Oru Kadamkadha Pole
 Ottayadippaathakal
 Kilivaathil (Mrinaalam)
1994
 Varaphalam
 Chanakya Soothrangal
 Chief Minister K.R. Gowthami
 Daivathinte Vikrithikal
 Avan Ananthapadmanabhan
 Orkathirunnappol
1995
 Special Squad
 Munpe Parakkunna Pakshi
 Maanthrikante Praavukal
 Poovukalku Punyakaalam
1996
 Kaliveedu
 Excuse Me Ethu Collegila?
 Saare Jahaan Se Achcha
1997
 Snehadooth
 Kalyana Unnikal
 Kottappurathe Koottukudumbam
 Ishtadanam
 Arjunan Pillayum Anchu Makkalum
 Kadhaanaayakan
 Mayaponman
1998
 Manthri Kochamma
 Manthrikumaran
 Nakshathrathaaraattu
 Harthaal
1999
 Varum Varaathirikkilla
 Deepasthambham Mahaashcharyam
 Vasanthiyum Lakshmiyum Pinne Njaanum
 Mazhavillu
2000
 Joker
 Dada Sahib
 Varnakkazhchakal
 Valliettan
 Sahayaathrikaykku Snehapoorvam
2001
 Nalacharitham Naalam Divasam
 Ishtam
 Karumaadikuttan
 Unnathangalil
 Sundara Purushan
 Vakkaalathu Naaraayanankutti
 Raakshasa Rajavu
 Sharjah To Sharjah
 Nakshathrangal Parayaathirunnathu
 Chethaaram
2002
 Oomapenninu Uriyadappayyan
 Kunjikoonan
 Pranayamanithooval
 Kaattuchembakam
 Basketball
 Snehithan
 Nammal
 Kuberan
2003
 Swapnakkoodu
 War And Love
 Pattanathil Sundaran
 Anyar
 Sadanandante Samayam
 Mr. Brahmachari
 Singaari Bolona
 Meerayude Dukhavum Muthuvinte Swapnavum
 Choonda
 Zameendaar
2004
 Kazhcha
 Koottu
 Udayam
2005
 Thanmathra
 Hridayathil Sookshikkaan
 Raappakal
2006
 The Don
 Kali
 Karutha Pakshikal
 Palunku
2007
 Anchil Oral Arjunan
 Payum Puli
 Nanma
 Nagaram
 Aakaasham
2008
 Swarnam
 Shakespeare M.A. Malayalam
2009
 Aayirathil Oruvan
 Pathaam Adhyaayam
 Bhagavan
 Dalamarmarangal
 Bhramaram
 Malayaali
 Sufi Paranja Katha
 Ividam Swargamaanu
 Mithram (Not released yet)
 Currency (Background Score)
2010
 Yugapurushan
 Nallavan
 Advocate Lakshmanan - Ladies Only
 Inganeyum Oral
 Oridathoru Postman
 Kayam

2011
 Ithu Nammude Katha
 Yaathra Thudarunnu
 Shankaranum Mohananum
 Kanakompathu
 Ulakam Chuttum Valiban
 Pachuvum Kovalanum
 Vellaripravinte Changathi

2012
 Last Bench
 Aazhakkadal
 Naadabrahmam
 Ezham Suryan
 Mullamottum Munthirichaarum
 Bhoopadathil Illatha Oridam

2013
 Ayaal
 Breaking News Live

2014
 My Dear Mummy
 To Noora with Love
 Color Balloon
 Little Superman 3D

2015
 Life Full of Life

2016
 Sukhamaayirikkatte
 Mud Maza

Highlight songs 
 Uchalu Tirumalava (Mamalakalkkappurath)
 Raree rareeram raro (Onnu Muthal Poojyam Varae)
 Neermizhippeeliyil
 Ila Kozhiyum sisirathil
 Sahyasaanu sruthi
 Pathinezhinte Poomkaralin (Vellaripraavinte Changaathi)
 Pranathosmi
 Mullapoovin muthe
 Enthe nin pinakkam
 Kananakuyilinu kathilidanoru
 Hrudaya Mrudanga 
 Pramadavaniyil veendum
 Krishna née en krishnamanee
 Unnee vavao ponnunnee
 Swarakanyakamar
 Mindathedi kuyile (Thanmaathra)
 Thekkini kolaya chumaril (Sufi Paranja Katha)
 Ithaloornu veena (Thanmaathra)
 Mele vellithinkal (Thanmaathra)
 Annarakkanna vaa (Bhramaram)
 Kaattru veliyedi kannamma (Thanmaathra)
 Pokathe kariyilakkatte (Loudspeaker)
 Shivadam shivanamam (Mazhavillu)
 Dhwani tharanga tharalam
 Kanneer mazhayathu (Joker)
 En ammae onnu kaanaan (Nammal)
 Pon kasavu njoriyum
 Moonnaam thrukkannil
 Indraneelam choodi agraharam thedi
 Kukku kukku kuyile
 Oru mathavumanyamalla
 Kodi kodi adimakal
 Thekko Thekkorikkal (Vellaripraavinte Changaathi)
 Kaanumbol parayamo (Ishtam)
 Chanchala dhruda pada thaalam (Ishtam)
 Swapnam thyajichal swargam labhikkum (Raakshasaraajaavu)
 Chandanathennalay njan ninte lolamaam
 Ponnavani vettam thirumuttam
 Chembarundin chelunde
 Kunjurangum koottinullil
 Swarajathi paadum pynkilee
 Irulin Mahanidrayil ninnunarthi nee
 Sukhamanee nilaavu (Nammal)
 Oru mazhappakshi paadunnu
 Manimukilae nee
 Kannivasantham kaattil moolum
 Inayarayannam kulichu keri
 Agadha neela samudrachuzhikalil
 Thanka manassu amma manassu (Raappakal)
 Kallyana prayamaanu 
 Ilam manju mulam
 Manassu oru manthrikakkoodu
 Deepankuram poothorungumaakaasam
 Kettu tharaattinte thaalam
 Dhanumasappenninu poothaalam
 Enikkum oru naavundenkil
 Kadanja chandanamo nin meni
 Prema madhu thedum
 Makara nilavil madhuravumaayi
 Karimizhiyaale oru kadha parayaam njaan
 Marakkaam ellam marakkam (Swapnakkoodu)
 Malarkili inayude (Swapnakkoodu)
 Pedi thonni aadyam kandappol
 Kannanaayaal Raadha venam (Pattanatthil Sundaran)
 Pukkikkuyile kallikkuyile (Anyar)
 Neeyarinnjo neelakkuzhali (Sadaanandante Samayam)
 Omalale ente manassin
 Tharivala kayyalenne (Sadaanandante Samayam)
 Kaananakkuyilinu
 Kuyile nin kurumkuzhalil
 Kannuneer puzhayude theerathu (Meerayude Dukkhavum Muthuvinte Swapnavum)
 Thaamarakkanna
 Kuttanadan kayalile (Kaazhcha)
 Kalabhakkuri charthende
 Jugnu re Jugnu re (Kaazhcha)
 Aalmaram chaayum neram
 Ammaanam chemmaanam
 Meda ponveyiloothiyurukki
 Neeyente paattil sreeragamayi
 Sindoora sandhye parayoo
 Snehathin poo nulli
 Aalilakkanna
 Chanthu pottum chenkelassum
 Kilivaathilil kaathorthu njan
 Ponnolathumbi 
 Ravin nilakaayal
 Mazhayil rathri mazhayil (Karuttha Pakshikal)
 Puthumazhayay pozhiyam
 Manassee saanthamakoo
 Thalolam thane thaaraattum
 Vala nalla kuppi vala vangitharum
 Manithaliyay ee manam thelinju
 Kunkuma malarukalo virinju
 Kaattu thulli kayalolam
 Niranazhi Ponnin (Valyettan)
 Ninte kannil virunnuvannu
 Annarakkanna vaa
 Vaa vaa thaamarappenne

Awards
State Film Critics Award
 1989 – Best Music Director -Mudra,Chanakyan

State Film Critics Award
 1992 – Best Background Music Director -Daivathinte Vikruthikal

Mathrubhumi Medimix Film Award 1999
 1999 –  Best Music Director -Vasantiyum Lakshmiyum Pinne Njanum,Deepasthambham Mahascharyam

Film Fare Award 2000
 2000 – Joker

AVT Grihalakshmi T V Award 2006
 2006 –  Best Music Director -Serial : Minnukettu

Annual Malayalam Movie Award 2009, UAE
 2009 –  Best Music Director

Ravindran Award 2009
 2009 –  Best Music Director

Kerala State Film Awards 2009
 2009 –  Best Music Director -Sufi Paranja Katha

Personal life
He is married to Beena and has two children. His elder child, Mobina, sang a few songs directed by him and now she is married. His son, Vishnu, is an upcoming Music Programmer. Vishnu has already composed a few albums and has been assisting senior composers in orchestration.

References

 Official Mohan Sithara Website.
 Janayugam article (in Malayalam)
 Mohan Sithara-Shining Star In Malayalam Music World.
 New York Times
 MusicIndia, Mohan Sithara Contributions
 
 Mohan Sithara Contributions
 Mohan Sithara at MSI

Malayalam film score composers
Kerala State Film Award winners
Musicians from Thrissur
Living people
Filmfare Awards South winners
Film musicians from Kerala
1959 births
20th-century Indian composers
21st-century Indian composers